Bangali Paltan was a British Indian military unit formed during World War One. The soldiers were recruited from the Bengal region and trained in Karachi. They fought in Mesopotamia, and were stationed in Baghdad. After the end of World War One, they were used to crush a rebellion by Kurds in the Middle East. 63 soldiers in the unit died. Most of recruit came from middle class Bengali families. Notable soldiers in the unit included Khwaja Habibullah, Kazi Nazrul Islam, Ranadaprasad Saha and  Mahbubul Alam.

References

British Indian Army regiments
Bangladesh Army